Shelburne County is a county in the Canadian province of Nova Scotia.

History
Shelburne County was founded in 1784 shortly following the influx of Loyalist settlers evacuated from the newly independent United States of America.  It was originally named Port Roseway, until it became a very busy town and was considered to be the capital of Nova Scotia, in which the name was changed to Shelburne in an attempt to please Lord Shelburne, the British Prime Minister from 1782 to 1783. The boundaries of Shelburne County were established by Governor and Council on December 16, 1785.

The first Loyalists arrived in May 1783. They were faced with a somewhat bleak environment in which to make their homes. The land is very rocky with acidic soil. There is also a lot of forest.

The area had previously been settled by French-speaking Catholic Acadians, many of whom had been deported to British Colonies. The new arrivals included Black Loyalists who were given substandard land, particularly around Birchtown. In 1796 about 600 Jamaican Maroons were deported to this area of Nova Scotia as well.

In 1824, at a time when the lines of a number of counties were being cut out and marked, the boundary between Queens and Shelburne Counties was surveyed.

In 1836 Shelburne County was divided into two separate and distinct counties with Yarmouth County being formed out of what had been part of Shelburne County.

In 1854, Shelburne County was divided into two districts for court sessional purposes - Shelburne and Barrington. In 1879, these districts were incorporated as district municipalities.

Demographics 

Population trend

Mother tongue language (2011)

Ethnic Groups (2006)

Communities

Towns
Clark's Harbour
Lockeport
Shelburne

District municipalities
Municipality of the District of Barrington
Municipality of the District of Shelburne

Access routes
Highways and numbered routes that run through the county, including external routes that start or finish at the county boundary:

Highways

Trunk Routes

Collector Routes:

External Routes:
None

Notable people

James Bagnall
John Alexander Barry
John Brecken
Mal Davis
David George (Baptist)
Jody Holden
Asa McGray
Nehemiah McGray
Donald McKay
Thomas Robertson
Wishart McLea Robertson
Nathaniel Whitworth White
Gideon White

See also
List of communities in Nova Scotia
Black Lake listings within Nova Scotia.

References

External links

Photographs of historic monuments in Shelburne County
Discover Shelburne County
Shelburne County Today
Western Counties Regional Library Website
The Loyalist Link: The Forest and The Sea